The Twilight Saga: Eclipse is a 2010 American romantic fantasy film directed by David Slade. It was written by Melissa Rosenberg and was adapted from Stephenie Meyer's 2007 novel Eclipse. The sequel to The Twilight Saga: New Moon (2009), it is the third installment in The Twilight Saga film series. The film stars Kristen Stewart, Robert Pattinson, and Taylor Lautner, reprising their roles as Bella Swan, Edward Cullen, and Jacob Black, respectively. Bryce Dallas Howard joins the cast as returning character Victoria, who was previously portrayed by Rachelle Lefevre in the first two films.

Summit Entertainment announced it had greenlit the film on February 20, 2009. Principal photography began on August 17, in Vancouver, Canada, and finished on October 31, with post-production beginning early the following month.

The Twilight Saga: Eclipse premiered in Los Angeles on June 24, and Summit Entertainment theatrically released it in the United States on June 30. It became the first and only The Twilight Saga film to be released in IMAX.  The film grosssed $698 million worldwide, becoming the sixth-highest-grossing film of 2010. It held the record for biggest midnight opening in the United States and Canada, grossing $30.1 million, beating The Twilight Saga: New Moon until it was surpassed by Harry Potter and the Deathly Hallows – Part 2 (2011). The film then scored the biggest Wednesday opening in the United States and Canada with $68.5 million, beating Transformers: Revenge of the Fallen (2009). The Twilight Saga: Eclipse has also become the film with the widest independent release, beating The Twilight Saga: New Moon, and the widest domestic release, playing in 4,416 theaters, beating Iron Man 2 (2010) until it was surpassed by Despicable Me 2 (2013).

The film received two sequels, The Twilight Saga: Breaking Dawn – Part 1 and The Twilight Saga: Breaking Dawn – Part 2, in 2011 and 2012, respectively.

Plot

In Seattle, not far from Forks, Victoria attacks Riley Biers, so she can begin to create an army of newborns with him to get her revenge on Edward Cullen for killing her true love James.

Back in Forks, Edward and Bella Swan discuss the complications of becoming an immortal vampire. At 18 years old, one year older than Edward was when he became a vampire, Bella expresses her aversion to the idea of marrying so young. Edward refuses to turn her into a vampire until they are married, his argument that she should have various human experiences she would otherwise miss. While Charlie Swan investigates the disappearance of Riley Biers, Edward suspects his disappearance was caused by the newborn vampires, furthering his suspicions is Riley's intrusion into Bella's room.

Although Edward fears for her safety, Bella insists that Jacob Black and the rest of the werewolf pack would never harm her, but Edward is still unconvinced. Bella goes to La Push to see Jacob and returns home unharmed. During one of her visits, Jacob confesses he is in love with her, and forcefully kisses her. Furious, Bella punches him and sprains her hand, and Edward later threatens Jacob if he ever touches her without her consent again and tells him to wait for Bella to give it to him. She even revokes the invitations for Jacob and his pack members to her graduation party, but when he apologizes for his behavior, she forgives him.

Meanwhile, Alice sees a vision of the newborn army attacking Forks led by Riley Biers. Jacob, accompanied by Quil and Embry overhear this, which leads to an alliance between the Cullens and Wolf pack. Later, the Cullens and the wolves agree to a meeting place and time to train and discuss strategy.

During the training Jasper explains to Bella that he was created by a vampire named Maria to control a newborn army. He hated his original existence and upon meeting Alice, joined the Cullens with her. Bella sees the true bond between a mated vampire pair and begins to understand Jasper better. Despite her reluctance to marry, Bella realizes that spending eternity with Edward is more important to her than anything else and agrees to marry him.

Edward and Bella camp up in the mountains to hide her from the bloodthirsty newborns. During the night, she overhears a conversation between Edward and Jacob, in which they temporarily put aside their hatred towards each other. In the morning, Jacob overhears Edward and Bella discussing their engagement and takes off. She desperately asks him to kiss her, realizing she has fallen in love with him. Edward finds out about the kiss but is not upset, as Bella tells him her love for Jacob is not as strong as her love for him.

When Victoria appears, Edward kills her while Seth kills Riley. The Cullens and the Quileute wolves, meanwhile, destroy her "army", though Jacob is injured saving Leah Clearwater from a newborn. Several members of the vampire police, the Volturi, arrive to deal with the newborn army. They also see that the Cullens are guarding the newborn, Bree Tanner, who had refused to fight and surrendered to Carlisle and Esme. Jane tortures her to collect information, then instructs Felix to kill her, despite the Cullens' efforts to spare her.

When Jane notes that Caius will find it interesting that Bella is still human, Bella informs her the date for her transformation has been set. She visits the injured Jacob to tell him that even though she is in love with him, she has chosen to be with Edward. Heartbroken but willing to accept her choice, Jacob reluctantly agrees to stop trying to come between her and Edward.

Bella and Edward go to their meadow, where she tells him she has decided to do things his way: get married, have sex, then be transformed into a vampire. She also explains that she never has been normal and never will be; she's felt out of place her entire life, but when she is in Edward's world she feels stronger and complete. At the end of the film they decide they need to tell Charlie about their engagement.

Cast

 Kristen Stewart as Bella Swan:An 18-year-old who finds herself surrounded by danger and targeted by the vengeful vampire Victoria. In the meantime, she must choose between her love for vampire Edward Cullen and her friendship with werewolf Jacob Black. Edward had proposed to Bella in the previous film and she says "yes" in this film, ultimately choosing him over Jacob.
 Robert Pattinson as Edward Cullen:Bella's vampire boyfriend who is capable of reading minds, except for Bella's. In New Moon, Edward left Bella, and now he has returned to try to stay a part of her life. Edward had proposed to Bella in the previous film and she says "yes" in this film.
 Taylor Lautner as Jacob Black:A werewolf in whom Bella found solace during Edward's absence in New Moon. Now, Edward has returned to Bella's life permanently, and Jacob is looking for ways to prove that he is a better choice for her. He is heartbroken and furious when he finds out Bella is marrying Edward but is unable to do anything to stop her.
 Peter Facinelli as Carlisle Cullen:A compassionate doctor who acts as a father figure to the Cullen coven. He turned each member of the Cullen family into vampires other than Alice (who was turned by an unknown vampire) and Jasper (who was turned by a Spanish vampire and his former love, Maria).
 Elizabeth Reaser as Esme Cullen: A loving mother figure to the Cullen coven and the wife of Carlisle. 
 Ashley Greene as Alice Cullen:A member of the Cullen family who can see "subjective" visions of the future and who is close friends with Bella. Being Jasper's mate, she helps him control his thirst for blood and is also the reason why he stays with the Cullen family. Alice's vision of the Seattle army helped the Cullen coven ally themselves with the Quileute pack and come up with a plan to protect Bella from Victoria.
 Kellan Lutz as Emmett Cullen: The strongest member of the Cullen family, who provides comic relief.
 Nikki Reed as Rosalie Hale: One of the most beautiful vampires in the world, according to Bella. She was raped by her fiancé and left to die before she became a vampire. She also feels that Bella is making a mistake for choosing to live the life of a vampire before she could live a full human life.
 Jackson Rathbone as Jasper Hale: A civil war fighter who was turned into a vampire to train newborns. He's also a member of the Cullen coven who trains his family to fight newborn vampires and can feel/control/manipulate emotions.
 Billy Burke as Charlie Swan: Bella's father and Forks's Chief of Police. Burke admits he has not read the Twilight books, saying, "We can't make the book, we're making the movie", and that he works from the scripts.
 Bryce Dallas Howard as Victoria: A vengeful vampire who wants to kill Bella to avenge her mate, James, whom she supposes to be killed by Edward in the first Twilight film. She meets her end at the hands of Edward when Bella cuts herself on purpose to distract her.
 Chaske Spencer as Sam Uley: Alpha of the Wolf Pack
 Tyson Houseman as Quil Ateara 
 Kiowa Gordon as Embry Call
 Alex Meraz as Paul Lahote
 Bronson Pelletier as Jared Cameron
 Gil Birmingham as Billy Black: a Quileute elder and Jacob's physically disabled father
 Tinsel Korey as Emily Young: Sam's imprinted fiancée whom he once hurt unintentionally
 Julia Jones as Leah Clearwater: Seth's older sister and the only female werewolf in existence.
 Booboo Stewart as Seth Clearwater: Leah's younger brother Jacob's friend.
 Dakota Fanning as Jane: A loyal servant to the Volturi and Alec's twin sister.
 Cameron Bright as Alec: A loyal servant to the Volturi and Jane's twin brother.
 Xavier Samuel as Riley Biers: The one Victoria changed to help her form an army of newborn vampires.
 Jodelle Ferland as Bree Tanner: A newborn vampire created to fight the Cullens, in the newborn army. She is executed by the Volturi at the end of the film.
 Sarah Clarke as Renée Dwyer: Bella's mother who lives in Jacksonville, Florida with her husband Phil.
 Anna Kendrick as Jessica Stanley: One of Bellas friends in Forks.
 Michael Welch as Mike Newton: One of Bella's friends in Forks. Mike has a crush on Bella, and does not like Edward.
 Christian Serratos as Angela Weber: Bella's shy but caring friend
 Justin Chon as Eric Yorkie: Bella's friend and Angela's boyfriend
 Jack Huston as Royce King II: Rosalie's ex-fiancé who drunkenly beat her, resulting in Rosalie's transformation, which led her to kill him afterwards
 Catalina Sandino Moreno as Maria: The one that turns Jasper into a vampire.
 Charlie Bewley as Demetri: a Volturi guard who is a gifted tracker
 Daniel Cudmore as Felix: A loyal servant to the Volturi who is one of their guards. He executes Bree Tanner at the end of the film.

Production

Development

In early November 2008, Summit Entertainment obtained the film adaptation rights to the remaining novels in the Twilight book series, New Moon, Eclipse, and Breaking Dawn. On February 20, 2009, Summit confirmed that they would begin working on The Twilight Saga: Eclipse.  On the same day, it was announced that since The Twilight Saga: New Moon director Chris Weitz would be in post-production for New Moon when Eclipse began shooting, he would not be directing the third film. Instead, the film would be helmed by director David Slade. David Slade dove right into the project, interviewing cast members individually between two trough three times to discuss characters and the plot.

Casting
Summit Entertainment revealed that they would replace Rachelle Lefevre, who played an evil vampire named Victoria, with Bryce Dallas Howard in late July 2009. They attributed the change to scheduling conflicts, and Lefevre responded by saying she was "stunned" and "greatly saddened" by the decision. Howard had previously rejected the role of Victoria as "too small of a part" when she was approached to play her in Twilight.

Silent Hill's Jodelle Ferland was cast as the newly turned vampire, Bree Tanner. Other new cast members include Xavier Samuel as Riley, Jack Huston as Royce King II, Catalina Sandino Moreno as Maria, Julia Jones as Leah Clearwater, and Boo Boo Stewart as Seth Clearwater.

Actors who auditioned for the various roles were not given a script to work from. Instead, actress Kirsten Prout mentioned, "they made the scenes exact transcripts from the book.... They didn't give the screenplay out. So, the audition side was just reading a page of Twilight and reading the lines that were interspersed between the descriptions."

Filming and post-production
Principal photography for Eclipse began on August 17, 2009, at Vancouver Film Studios. On August 29, photos captured Kristen Stewart, Billy Burke, and other principal actors, filming a scene with graduation caps and gowns. September 2 brought Xavier Samuel together with Stewart and Robert Pattinson filming at a soundstage for scenes at Bella's house. Director David Slade stated that they filmed a scene with a tent on September 13. He also said that they filmed a kiss between Jacob and Bella on September 17. Filming wrapped up on October 29, 2009, while post-production began in late November. Slade published multiple updates on his Twitter account proclaiming that editing was going well. He said the "story and the way [they] approached the film calls for a more realistic approach." In April 2010, it was revealed that reshoots to the film were needed. Both Slade and Stephenie Meyer were present at the shoot along with the three main stars.

In January 2010, an early draft of the film's script was leaked on the Internet. The script presumably belonged to star Jackson Rathbone, as his name was watermarked across each page.

Music

The score for The Twilight Saga: Eclipse was composed by Howard Shore, who composed the scores for such films as The Lord of the Rings trilogy and The Aviator. The film's soundtrack was released on June 8, 2010, by Atlantic Records in conjunction with music supervisor Alexandra Patsavas' Chop Shop label. The lead single from the soundtrack is "Neutron Star Collision (Love Is Forever)", performed by the British band Muse.

On May 11, 2010, MySpace announced that the full Eclipse soundtrack listing would be unveiled starting at 8 a.m. the following morning every half-hour, totaling six hours. The album debuted at #2 on Billboard 200.

Visual effects 

As in the previous film, Eclipse used CGI animation to depict the wolf pack when they were transformed into wolves. Mostly, the wolves were simply animated, although in one scene with Jacob and Bella, Taylor Lautner himself played the wolf, with him wearing a gray suit which was reportedly "so his skin tone wouldn’t bounce back onto Stewart and create lighting issues"; the visual effects of the wolf was later edited onto Lautner.

Distribution

Marketing
On November 5, 2009, the American Film Market revealed the first poster for Eclipse. In late February 2010, Summit Entertainment announced that the first trailer would be attached to the studio's own film Remember Me, which also stars Robert Pattinson. On March 10, 2010, a 10-second preview of the trailer was released online, followed by the release of the full trailer the next day. The trailer's release coincided with the launching of the film's official website. On March 19, 2010, The Twilight Saga: New Moon was released on DVD and Blu-ray; the Walmart Ultimate Fan Edition includes a 7-minute first look at Eclipse. On March 23, the second poster for the film was released. The final Eclipse trailer debuted on The Oprah Winfrey Show, and in promotion for the movie, Robert Pattinson, Kristen Stewart, Taylor Lautner, and Dakota Fanning made a guest appearance on the show May 13; the audience also viewed a version of the film. On June 6, 2010, a sneak peek of the film was shown at the 2010 MTV Movie Awards; that same week, more clips and TV spots were released also.

In order to tie in the lunar eclipse on June 26, 2010, Summit Entertainment hosted screenings of the first two films in The Twilight Saga film series in twelve cities throughout the United States. The event was streamed live from Philadelphia and San Diego, and included cast member appearances and special previews of Eclipse.

Nordstrom and Summit Entertainment joined together to sell a fashion collection inspired by the film, as was done for the previous installment. Created by Awake Inc., the collection was based on Ashley Greene's character, Alice, and Kristen Stewart's character, Bella. The Eclipse collection became available on June 4, 2010. In a similar style to its New Moon marketing, Burger King started promoting the film on Monday, June 21, 2010. Their promotion heavily focuses on the "Team Jacob vs. Team Edward" aspect of the film.

Release
Tickets for Eclipse went on sale on various online movie ticket sellers on Friday, May 14, 2010. The official red carpet premiere for the film was held on June 24, 2010, at the Nokia Plaza in Los Angeles. An official United Kingdom premiere was held in Leicester Square, London on July 1, 2010. However, Kristen Stewart, Robert Pattinson and Taylor Lautner were not present.

Eclipse opened in 4,416 theaters and 193 IMAX screens. With that, early predictions forecasted the film will gross anywhere from $150 million to $180 million within its first six days of release, putting the record set by The Twilight Saga: New Moon in danger of being broken. Eclipse accounted for 82 percent of Fandango's online ticket sales, reaching the top five on May 14, 2010. MovieTickets.com stated that Eclipse was the top advance ticket seller on its site, with more than 50 percent of daily ticket sales. The film was the top advance ticket seller as of June 2010. Early ticket sales for the film also have broken records for Gold Class Cinemas, where more than 8,500 Twilight fans have reserved tickets; the Fairview, TX location sold out their showings of Eclipse for June 30.

The film was re-released into theaters on September 13, 2010 in recognition of lead character Bella Swan's birthday.

Home media
The Twilight Saga: Eclipse was released on DVD in the United States on December 4, 2010. The Two Disc Special Edition DVD and Blu-ray discs include special features such as: eight deleted and extended scenes, music videos by Muse and Metric from The Twilight Saga: Eclipse: Original Motion Picture Soundtrack and commentaries by Kristen Stewart and Robert Pattinson, Stephenie Meyer and Wyck Geoffery. It was released on December 1, 2010 in New Zealand and Australia. There is also a "gift set" Two-Disc Collector's Edition which features a unique packaging and 6 collectible photo cards. In North American DVD sales, the film has currently grossed $164,676,695 and has sold more than 9,424,505 units.

Reception

Box office
Eclipse set a new record for the biggest midnight opening in the United States and Canada in box office history, grossing $30.1 million in over 4,000 theaters. The record was formerly held by the previous film, The Twilight Saga: New Moon, with $26.3 million in 3,514 theaters. It held the record until the summer of 2011, when it was broken by Harry Potter and the Deathly Hallows – Part 2, which made $43.5 million. Eclipse also had the highest midnight gross of The Twilight Saga film series until it was topped in November 2011 by its successor, The Twilight Saga: Breaking Dawn - Part 1 ($30.3 million). The movie also surpassed Transformers: Revenge of the Fallen in total grosses for a midnight screening in IMAX. Eclipse garnered more than $1 million at 192 theaters, while Revenge of the Fallen earned $959,000, until it was beaten five months later by Harry Potter and the Deathly Hallows – Part 1 with $1.4 million. The film grossed $68.5 million on its opening day in the United States and Canada, becoming the biggest single-day Wednesday opening over Revenge of the Fallen $62 million, and the third biggest single-day opening ever at the time. As of 2011, the film has the third-highest opening-day gross of the series behind New Moon ($72.7 million) and Breaking Dawn - Part 1 ($72.0 million). Furthermore, the film earned $9 million at various IMAX locations during its first week.

After six days of release in the United States and Canada, the film ended Independence Day with a total of $176.4 million, including $64.8 million during its first weekend. In its second weekend, the film fell 51%, a better standing than its predecessors, grossing an estimated $31.7 million.

The film opened overseas with $16.2 million, beating records set by the film's predecessor in Russia with an estimated $3.9 million (since surpassed by Pirates of the Caribbean: On Stranger Tides which earned $5 million), in Italy with an estimated $3.1 million, in the Philippines, grossing $1.2 million, and in Belgium, where it grossed an estimated $1.1 million. It is the third-best opening day ever in Italy; in the Philippines, Eclipse topped Spider-Man 3 for best opening day ever, and was the highest opening day ever in Belgium. In three days, Eclipse topped the box office with $121.3 million and during its first weekend it earned $71.3 million.

Overseas in its second weekend, the film grossed $70.6 million from 9,440 screens in 63 markets, a 1% drop from its first weekend. The film opened in the United Kingdom at number one, grossing $20.7 million from 523 locations (including previews), the market's biggest opening of 2010 (until Toy Story 3 surpassed it) and about $1.7 million more than The Twilight Saga: New Moon grossed in its opening weekend in November 2009. The film also debuted at number one in France, grossing $13.3 million, which marks the third-largest opening in the country for a 2010 film (behind Harry Potter and the Deathly Hallows – Part 1 ($20.7 million) and Alice in Wonderland's ($15.4 million). The film opened at number one in South Korea with $4.9 million.

The film ended its box-office run in the US and Canada on October 21, 2010 having grossed $300.5 million, surpassing its predecessor The Twilight Saga: New Moon, which grossed $296.6 million a few months before, to become the highest-grossing film of the franchise and the highest-grossing romantic fantasy, werewolf and vampire film of all time at the American and Canadian box office. It is the fourth movie of 2010 to reach $300 million and ranks 46th on the all-time chart in the US and Canada. Compared to its predecessor overseas, it has grossed $393 million against New Moon's $413.2 million. Therefore, internationally, Eclipse remains the second-highest-grossing film in the franchise with $693.6 million against New Moon $710 million. Eclipse highest-grossing markets except the US and Canada are the UK, Ireland and Malta ($45.7 million), Germany ($33.1 million), France and the Maghreb region ($33 million), Italy ($20 million), Brazil ($30.5 million) and Australia ($28.6 million).

Critical response

Review aggregation website Rotten Tomatoes gives the film an approval rating of 47% based on 255 reviews and a rating average of 5.5/10. The site's general consensus is that, "Stuffed with characters and overly reliant on uninspired dialogue, Eclipse won't win The Twilight Saga many new converts, despite an improved blend of romance and action fantasy." Metacritic, another review aggregator, rated it a weighted average of 58/100 based on 38 reviews, indicating "mixed or average reviews".

The Hollywood Reporter said the film "nails it". Peter Debruge of Variety said that the film "finally feels more like the blockbuster this top-earning franchise deserves". Rick Bentley of McClatchy Newspapers said the film was the best in The Twilight Saga so far, suggesting that, "The person who should be worried is Bill Condon, the director tapped for the two-part finale, Breaking Dawn. He's got a real challenge to make movies as good as Eclipse." The New York Times praised David Slade's ability to make an entertaining film, calling it funny and better than its predecessors, but wrote that the acting has not improved much. Giving the film 4.5 out of 5 stars, Betsey Sharkey from the Los Angeles Times praised David Slade's method of blending his previous works to form a funny movie. She stated, "Eclipse eclipse[s] its predecessors." The film was also listed in 49th place by Moviefone on its list of the 50 best movies of 2010.

Roger Moore of the Orlando Sentinel, who gave the film 2.5 out of 4 stars, said, "The dullness of the performances really stands out when somebody like Bryce Dallas Howard, or Anna Kendrick turn up and liven up their scenes." While calling the film "too chatty and too long", he did compliment David Slade's directing and noted that the movie will please the fans. Michael Phillips of the Chicago Tribune gave the film 2 out of 5 stars, stating that David Slade's pacing is "everything like molasses running uphill". He also criticized the characters, the actors portraying them, the big close-ups of hand-held devices, and called Howard Shore's score "gunk". Wesley Morris from the Boston Globe said, "If the first two movies were "get a room," part three is "get a therapist". He said the second and third film "repeat that discovery [in Twilight] without truly deepening it...the movies are interesting without ever being good."

Geoff Berkshire of Metromix said that while "Eclipse restores some of the energy New Moon zapped out of the franchise and has enough quality performances to keep it involving", the film "isn't quite the adrenaline-charged game-changer for love story haters that its marketing might lead you to believe. The majority of the 'action' remains protracted and not especially scintillating should-we-or-shouldn't-we conversations between the central triangle."
Roger Ebert of the Chicago Sun Times gave the film a more positive review than for the first two films in the saga, but still felt the movie was a constant, unclever conversation between the three main characters. He criticized the "gazes" both Edward and Jacob give Bella throughout the film and said audiences unfamiliar with the saga would understand the opening or closing scenes. He gave the film 2 stars out of 4. Steve Persall of the St. Peterburg Times rated the film C− and called it "just monstrously bad". He said, "Eclipse leaves the sputtering story arc in idle, with only an uneasy truce between the vampire and werewolf clans amounting to anything new". The Guardian columnist Peter Bradshaw gave the film a one-star rating in a review that lampooned Bella's continued abstinence, among other plot elements. Bradshaw, dubbing the series "The epic of the unbroken duck", wrote that "Bella Swan is starting to make Doris Day look like the nympho from hell", and concluded that "it could be time to sharpen the wooden stake."

Accolades

Sequel

Summit Entertainment announced it would adapt Breaking Dawn  into a two-part film in June 2010. The Twilight Saga: Breaking Dawn – Part 1 was released on November 18, 2011 and Part 2 on November 16, 2012 with Bill Condon directing.

References

External links

 
 
 
 
 
 
 

The Twilight Saga (film series)
2010 films
2010 fantasy films
2010 romance films
2010s romantic fantasy films
2010s teen romance films
2010s teen fantasy films
American romantic fantasy films
American sequel films
American teen romance films
Films directed by David Slade
Films produced by Wyck Godfrey
Films scored by Howard Shore
Films set in Washington (state)
Films shot in Vancouver
Golden Raspberry Award winning films
IMAX films
Summit Entertainment films
Temple Hill Entertainment films
American werewolf films
American vampire films
2010s English-language films
2010s American films